A  is a type of Japanese garden ornament and music device. It consists of an upside down buried pot with a hole at the top. Water drips through the hole at the top onto a small pool of water inside of the pot, creating a pleasant splashing sound that rings inside of the pot similar to a bell or Japanese zither, called a koto. It is usually built next to a traditional Japanese stone basin called chōzubachi, part of a tsukubai for washing hands before the Japanese tea ceremony.

Traditional construction
Both glazed and unglazed ceramic jars can be used. Recently, metal  have also become commercially available. Unglazed jars are considered best, as the rough surface aids in the building of drops. The height ranges from 30 cm to 1 m, and the diameter from 30 cm to 50 cm. The hole at the top has a diameter of circa 2 cm. Similar to a bell, the jar of a good  will ring when struck. A jar producing a good sound will create a good sounding . Similarly, a cracked jar, like a cracked bell, will not produce a good sound.

The  usually rests on a bed of gravel underground. The base underneath the jar is sometimes mortared to keep the water in, and sometimes consists only of soil as for example clay. The drainage pipe makes sure that the water level in the  does not rise too high. Sometimes ceramic tiles are also used on the sides of the jar. The designs and materials used for a  also vary widely, often depending on the local region.

Usually, only a single jar is buried underneath a  Japanese stone basin. However, in some rare cases there may also be two  adjacent to each other in front of the same . Such a double installation can be found for example in front of the Iwasaki Castle, Nisshin city, Aichi Prefecture, in the campus of the Takasaki Art Center College, Takasaki, Gunma prefecture, or in Kyoto University, Kyoto. However, having two openings about 50 cm apart means that it is difficult to cover the ergonomic best spot for washing hands with both openings. Thus, the creation of the sound is usually done intentionally by splashing water over the two designated spots, rather than accidentally by washing hands.  with more than two jars may also be possible, such as for example three jars at the Shirotori garden in Nagoya.

Modern variations
There are a number of modern variations form the traditional . the list below shows some of the possibilities for modern .

Metal  are also available nowadays.
Some above ground devices similar to a  have also been installed, for example as part of sculptures.
 are also installed indoors
Commercial venues (restaurants, shops, and also offices) may have the sound of the indoor or outdoor  amplified electronically and played through speakers.

History

It is believed that initially a vessel was buried upside down next to the washing basin in Japanese gardens to act as a drainage system. This sometimes produced pleasant sounds, and gardeners subsequently sought to improve the sound quality of the device. Their rise in popularity and the name  originated from the middle of the Edo period (1603–1867), around the same time the stone basin  was developed. At the end of the Edo period, the creation of  became less frequent, but became popular again during the Meiji Era (1867–1912).

At the beginning of the 20th century, i.e. the early Shōwa period, both the name  and the device were all but forgotten, and a report of Professor Katsuzo Hirayama at the Tokyo University of Agriculture from 1959 could find only two  in Japan, both of them inoperable and filled with earth.

Acoustics
The sound of a  has its own name in Japanese, called . The  is the sound of the first few water drops at the beginning of washing hands. The  describes both the sound of a lot of water falling at the same time during washing hands and the slower drops at the end of the washing.

A superior  has water drops originating from different spots on the surface of the jar. Unglazed jars hold moisture better, and therefore have drops originate from more spots on the surface. The impact of the water on the surface creates a sound, that is amplified by the design of the jar.

It is said that every  sounds different.

Philosophy
Instead, the visitor washes his/her hands, and suddenly hears the pleasant sounds coming from underground. This clear sound of water drops is considered relaxing and soothing, and also described as beautiful and peaceful.

See also

Shishi-odoshi
Japanese garden

References

External links 
What is a Sui-kin-kutsu?
Suikinkutsu Construction Details

Garden ornaments
Japanese music
Japanese style of gardening
Ambient music